Tiruppanantaal Arunajadewswarar Temple (திருப்பனந்தாள் அருணஜடேசுவரர் கோயில்) is a Hindu temple located at Tirupanandal  in Thanjavur district of Tamil Nadu, India.  The historical name of the place is Thadagaieswaram.  The presiding deity is Shiva. He is called as Aruna Jadewswarar. His consort is known as Periya Nayaki.

Significance 
It is one of the shrines of the 275 Paadal Petra Sthalams - Shiva Sthalams glorified in the early medieval Tevaram poems by Tamil Saivite Nayanar Tirugnanasambandar. Hymns in praise of the temple have been sung by Sambandar, Thirunavukkarasar, Nambiyandar Nambi and Arunagirinathar.

Architecture 
Aruna Jadeswarar Temple is situated in the town of Thiruppanandal, headquarters of the Thiruppanandal block of the Thiruvidaimarudur taluk. The Thiruppanandal Adheenam is based here. The temple lies on the banks of the Kollidam River. The presiding deity is Shiva in the form of Aruna Jadeswarar. His consort is Periya Nayaki.  There are shrines to Ambika, Durga and Naga Kanni. The Rajagopura of the temple faces west. The temple has a total of three prakaras. The temple complex encloses the Kasi matha founded by Saivite saint Kumaragurupara Desikar.

Literary Mention 
Tirugnanasambandar describes the feature of the deity as:

References

External links 
 
 

Shiva temples in Thanjavur district
Padal Petra Stalam